Jekhane Bhooter Bhoy (English: Where there is a fear of ghosts) is a 2012 Indian Bengali film directed by Sandip Ray. There are three short ghost stories in this film.

Plot 
The film starts with Tarinikhuro or Tarinicharan Banerjee, one of Satyajit Ray's characters, telling some boys from his fanclub about ghosts. In the first and second stories the ghosts he talks about were Satyajit Ray's Anath Babur Bhoy and Brown Saheber Bari. The last one was Sharadindu Bandyopadhyay’s Bhoot Bhobishyot. (Initially four stories were supposed to be filmed, but the fourth one, Lucknow-er Duel was dropped later to avoid the length).

Anath Babur Bhoy
Anath Babur Bhoy ( Anath Babu's Terror ) revolves around the story of Anathbandhu Mitra, who is a ghost hunter. He, along with his friend, Sitesh Babu, narrate their experience regarding a dilapidated haunted house, Haldar Mansion, "Haldar Bari".

Brown Saheber Bari
Brown Saheber Bari ( Mr. Brown's Cottage ) is about "Simon", a mysterious entity whom the owner of the cottage, a British gentleman loved dearly.

Bhoot Bhobishyot
The story is based on a peculiar relationship between a writer and a friendly 19th century ghost. It is a light-hearted story with a memorable twist at the end of it all.

Cast

The story teller and listeners 
 Paran Bandyopadhyay as Tarini Khuro
 Subham Das as Poltu
 Ayus Das as Nyapla
 Amit Das as Bhulu
 Aritra Ghosh as Sunanda
 Ayan Shur as Chatpati
 Bimal Ghosh as Lakshman (the servant)

Anath Babur Bhoy 
 Dwijen Bandopadhyay as Anathbandhu Mitra
 Subhrajit Dutta as Sitesh Chatterjee
 Abanti Mohan Banerjee as Pranab Banerjee
 Haradhan Bose as Bharadwaj

Brown Saheber Bari 
 Abir Chatterjee as Ranjan Sengupta
 Bhaswar Chatterjee as Anikendra Bhowmik
 Biswajit Chakraborty as Hrishikesh Banerjee
 Lew Hilt as Dr. Larkin
 Sanjiban Guha as Nitish Samaddar

Bhut Bhabishyat 
 Saswata Chatterjee as Pratap Sarkar
 Paran Bandyopadhyay as Nandadulal Nandy
 Mousumi Bhattacharya as Komola
 Pradip Mukherjee as Gopidulal Nandy
 Panchu Gopal Dey as Nikunja Pal

Filming 
The film is produced by Shree Venkatesh Films and Surinder Films. The shooting of this film has been done in different places like Shantiniketan, Kalimpong, Raipur etc. The film released on 21 December 2012.

Home video release 
The film was released in Anamorphic Widescreen DVD format on March, 2013 with English subtitles and some bonus features in all regions with 5.1 channel surround sound for non-commercial home viewing.

See also 
 Bhooter Bhabishyat, 2012 Bengali film
 Chaar

References

External links 
 

2012 films
Indian children's films
Bengali-language Indian films
2010s Bengali-language films
Films directed by Sandip Ray